Paadhai Theriyudhu Paar is a 1960 Indian Tamil-language drama film directed by Nemai Ghosh. The film stars K. Vijayan and S. V. Subbaiah. It won the National Film Award for Best Feature Film in Tamil along with Kalathur Kannamma.

Plot

Cast 
 K. Vijayan as Murugesan
 S. V. Subbaiah
 S. V. Sahasranamam
 L. Vijayalakshmi
 Chandini
 R. Muthuraman
 T. K. Balachandran
 M. S. Sundari Bai

Production 
Nemai Ghosh and M. B. Sreenivasan formed a production company called Kumari Films, with contributions from more than 50 shareholders. Each of them contributed an amount ranging from 500 to  5,000 to start the banner. None of the members contributed more than  5,000. Kumari Films' inaugural production Paadhai Theriyudhu Paar was launched by the communist leader P. Jeevanandham. The film was the second directorial venture of Ghosh, who also worked as cinematographer.

Themes 
Paadhai Theriyudhu Paar addresses the trade union movement of India, and was scripted keeping the Communist Party of India (CPI) ideology in mind.

Soundtrack 
The music was composed by M. B. Sreenivasan, while the lyrics were written by Jayakanthan, Pattukkottai Kalyanasundaram and K. C. S. Arunachalam. The playback singers were T. M. Soundararajan, Thiruchi Loganathan, P. B. Sreenivas, A. L. Raghavan, A. S. Mahadevan, S. Janaki and P. Susheela. Vaali wrote the song "Koduthadellam Koduthan" for this film but it was rejected by Ghosh, and instead used in Padagotti (1964). The song "Thennankeetru" is based on Valaji raga, and was set to tune with a xylophone.

Release and reception 
Paadhai Theriyudhu Paar was released on 18 November 1960. In July, select reels of the film were made available for previewing as the final film was not yet complete. The Indian Express then wrote, "The plot unfolds itself with easy tempo and unflagging interest. The songs are natural and exceptionally homely. Photography and sound recording are superb". Reviewing the complete version on 19 November, they praised the film for minimal dramatisation and more naturalism. Despite critical acclaim, the film did not succeed commercially; the distributors complained that L. Vijayalakshmi did not dance, to which the director replied, "[Vijayalakshmi] knows how to dance, but the character she plays in the film does not!" According to historian Randor Guy, "internal dissensions spoiled the film's release and caused it to flop."

References

Bibliography

External links 
 

1960 films
1960s Tamil-language films
Films about communism
Films directed by Nemai Ghosh
Films scored by M. B. Sreenivasan